Maharawal Samarsimha or Maharawal Samar Singh was the ruler of the Guhila dynasty from 1272 to 1301. He was the son of Rawal Tejasimha and father of Ratnasimha.

He assisted the ruler of Gujrat, Sarangdeva Baghela against a Turkish Invasion. This Turkish invader is speculated to be Ghiyas ud din Balban or Alauddin Khalji.

If the invader was Alauddin Khalji, then his motives for invasion wont be devastation or annexation but passage to invade Gujrat. Alauddin was refused passage from Marwar , so the passage was drawn from Mewar. Samarsimha offered strong resistance from Mewar but Alauddin was able to do minor attack on Hindu shrines. but no major devastation was found.

Samar Singh has helped prathviraj Chohan in 2nd war of tarayan 

Date of birth uncertain
Date of death unknown
11th-century Indian monarchs
12th-century Indian monarchs